The flag of Alagoas was created by State Law of Alagoas No. 2628 on 23 September 1963. The colors (red, white, and blue) refer to the French Tricolore, symbolizing the ideals of the French Revolution: liberté, égalité, fraternité.

Symbolism
The coat of arms symbolizes the first city of Porto Calvo.

The three shells represent the three historic villages of the state, present-day Porto Calvo, Marechal Deodoro, and Penedo.

The three fish represent the three main and largest lagoons of the then-town: Mundaú, Manguaba, and Jequiá, and also represent fishing. The green bouquets in the center of the flag depict sugarcane and cotton.

The five-pointed silver star is a Brazilian heraldic tradition and refers to the star on the coat of arms of Brazil. It also refers to the Hino de Alagoas (pt), which refers to the state as a "bright star".

References

External links
 Lei Estadual nº 2.628, de 23 de setembro de 1963 

Flags of Brazil
Flags introduced in 1963
1963 establishments in Brazil
Alagoas
Flags displaying animals